Lys Mykyta was a Ukrainian-language satirical and humorous magazine. The magazine took its name from Ivan Franko's story about a wily fox. It was published between 1947 and 1990 by Edward Kozak and featured cartoons and caricatures. The poet Bohdan Nyzankiwsky was a regular contributor under his pen name Babay. Lys Mykyta was originally published in Munich where Kozak taught, but when he emigrated to the United States with Liuboslav Hutsaliuk (another regular contributor and friend of Kozak), it moved location.

References 

1947 establishments in Ukraine
1990 disestablishments in Ukraine
Defunct magazines published in Ukraine
Satirical magazines published in Europe
Magazines established in 1947
Magazines disestablished in 1990
Magazines published in Ukraine
Ukrainian-language magazines
Magazines published in Munich